Toxicodendron is a genus of flowering plants in the sumac family, Anacardiaceae. It contains trees, shrubs and woody vines, including poison ivy, poison oak, and the lacquer tree. All members of the genus produce the skin-irritating oil urushiol, which can cause a severe allergic reaction. The generic name is derived from the Greek words τοξικός (toxikos), meaning "poison," and δένδρον (dendron), meaning "tree". The best known members of the genus in North America are poison ivy (T. radicans), practically ubiquitous throughout most of eastern North America, and western poison oak (T. diversilobum), similarly ubiquitous throughout much of the western part of the continent.

The genus is a member of the Rhus complex, and has at various times been categorized as being either its own genus or a sub-genus of Rhus. There is evidence which points to keeping Toxicodendron as a separate monophyletic genus, but researchers have stated that the Toxicodendron and Rhus groups are complex and require more study to be fully understood.

Plants in the genus have pinnately compound, alternate leaves and whitish or grayish drupes. They are quite variable in appearance. The leaves may have smooth, toothed, or lobed edges, and all three types of leaf edges may be present in a single plant. The plants grow as creeping vines, climbing vines, shrubs, or, in the case of lacquer tree (T. vernicifluum) and poison sumac (T. vernix), as trees. While leaves of poison ivy and poison oaks usually have three leaflets, sometimes there are five or, occasionally, even seven leaflets. Leaves of poison sumac have 7–13 leaflets, and of Lacquer Tree, 7–19 leaflets.

The common names come from similar appearances to other species that are not closely related and to the allergic response to the urushiol. Poison oak is not an oak (Quercus, family Fagaceae), but this common name comes from the leaves' resemblance to white oak (Quercus alba) leaves, while poison ivy is not an ivy (Hedera, family Araliaceae), but has a superficially similar growth form. Technically, the plants do not contain a poison; they contain a potent allergen.

The resins of certain species native to Japan, China and other Asian countries, such as lacquer tree (T. vernicifluum) and wax tree (T. succedaneum), are used to make lacquer, and, as a byproduct of lacquer manufacture, their berries are used to make japan wax.

Candlewax
In East Asia, in particular in Japan, traditional candle fuel was produced from Toxicodendron vernicifluum (synonym: Rhus verniciflua) and Toxicodendron succedaneum (synonym: Rhus succedanea), among other sumac plants in the genus Toxicodendron, rather than beeswax or animal fats. The sumac wax was a byproduct of traditional Japanese lacquer manufacture. The conical rousoku candles produced from sumac wax burn with smokeless flame and were favored in many respects over candles made from lard or beeswax during the Tokugawa shogunate. Japan wax is not a true wax but a solid fat that contains 10-15% palmitin, stearin, and olein with about 1% japanic acid (1,21-heneicosanedioic acid). It is still used in many tropical and subtropical countries in the production of wax match sticks.

Avoidance, treatment, and safety
For specific information on prevention and treatment of Toxicodendron rashes, see Urushiol-induced contact dermatitis.

Selected species of Toxicodendron 
Toxicodendron acuminatum (or Rhus acuminata) grows in China, Bhutan, India and Nepal.
Toxicodendron calcicolum, endemic to China
Western poison oak (Toxicodendron diversilobum or Rhus diversiloba) is found throughout much of western North America, ranging from the Pacific coast into the Sierra Nevada and Cascade mountain ranges between southern British Columbia and southward into Baja California. It is extremely common in that region, where it is the predominant species of the genus. Indeed, it is California's most prevalent woody shrub.  Extremely variable, it grows as a dense shrub in open sunlight, or as a climbing vine in shaded areas. It propagates by creeping rhizomes or by seed. The compound leaves are divided into three leaflets, 35–100 mm long, with scalloped, toothed, or lobed edges. The leaves may be red, yellow, green, or some combination of those colors, depending on various factors, such as the time of year.
Asian poison ivy (Toxicodendron orientale, Rhus orientale or R. ambigua) is very similar to the American poison ivy, and replaces it throughout east Asia (so similar that some texts treat it as just a variety of the American species).
Small-flowered poison sumac (Toxicodendron parviflorum or Rhus parviflora) grows in the Himalayas between Kumaun, India and Bhutan
Potanin's lacquer tree or Chinese varnish tree (Toxicodendron potaninii or Rhus potaninii) from central China, is similar to T. vernicifluum but with (usually) fewer leaflets per leaf.  Growing up to 20 m tall, like T. vernicifluum it is used for lacquer production. The leaves have 7–9 leaflets.
Atlantic poison oak (Toxicodendron pubescens or Rhus toxicarium) grows mostly in sandy soils in eastern parts of the United States. Growing as a shrub, its leaves are in groups of three. Leaves are typically rounded or lobed and are densely-haired. Although it is often confused with the more common poison ivy, even in the scientific literature, Atlantic Poison oak has small clumps of hair on the veins on the underside of the leaves, while Poison ivy does not.
Poison ivy (Toxicodendron radicans or Rhus radicans) is extremely common in some areas of North America. In the United States, it grows in all states east of the Rockies. It also grows in Central America. Appearing as a creeping vine, a climbing vine, or a shrub, it reproduces both by creeping rootstocks and by seeds. The appearance varies. Leaves, arranged in an alternate pattern, usually in groups of three, are from 20 to 50 mm long, pointed at the tip, and can be toothed, smooth, or lobed, but never serrated. Leaves may be shiny or dull, and the color varies with the season. Vines grow almost straight up rather than wrapping around their support and can grow to 8–10 m in height. In some cases, Poison ivy may entirely engulf the supporting structure, and vines may extend outward like limbs so that it appears to be a Poison ivy "tree".
Western poison ivy (Toxicodendron rydbergii or Rhus rydbergii) is found in northern parts of the eastern United States. It also exists in the western United States and Canada but is much less common than poison oak. It may grow as a vine or a shrub. It was once considered a subspecies of poison ivy. It does sometimes hybridize with the climbing species. Western poison ivy is found in much of western and central United States and Canada, although not on the West Coast. In the eastern United States, it is rarely found south of New England.
Manzanillo (Toxicodendron striatum or Rhus striata) is a South American poisonous tree growing in the tropical rain forests on low elevation slopes. The name should not be confused with the unrelated Manchineel, a poisonous tree that is not a member of the Anacardiaceae.
Wax tree (Toxicodendron succedaneum or Rhus succedanea), a native of Asia, although it has been planted elsewhere, most notably in Australia and New Zealand. It is a large shrub or tree, up to 8 m tall, somewhat similar to a sumac tree. Because of its beautiful autumn foliage, it has been planted outside of Asia as an ornamental plant, often by gardeners who were apparently unaware of the dangers of allergic reactions. It is now officially classified as a noxious weed in Australia and New Zealand. The fatty-acid methyl ester of the kernel oil meets all of the major biodiesel requirements in the USA (ASTM D 6751-02, ASTM PS 121-99), Germany (DIN V 51606) and European Union (EN 14214).
Toxicodendron sylvestre (or Rhus sylvestris) grows in China, Japan, Korea and Taiwan.
Lacquer tree or varnish tree (Toxicodendron vernicifluum or Rhus verniciflua) grows in Asia, especially China and Japan. Growing up to 20 m tall, its sap produces an extremely durable lacquer. The leaves have 7–19 leaflets (most often 11–13). The sap contains the allergenic oil, urushiol. Urushiol gets its name from this species which in Japanese is called Urushi. Other names for this species include Japanese lacquer tree, Japanese Varnish Tree, and Japanese Sumac (Note: the term "varnish tree" is also occasionally applied to the Candlenut, Aleurites moluccana, a southeast Asian tree unrelated to Toxicodendron).
Poison sumac (Toxicodendron vernix or Rhus vernix) is a tall shrub or a small tree, from 2–7 m tall. It is found in swampy, open areas and reproduces by seeds. The leaves have between 7–13 untoothed leaflets, in a feather-compound arrangement. In terms of its potential to cause urushiol-induced contact dermatitis, poison sumac is far more virulent than other Toxicodendron species, even more virulent than poison ivy and poison oak. According to some botanists, T. vernix is the most toxic plant species in the United States (Frankel, 1991).

Notes

References 
 Frankel, Edward, Ph.D. 1991. Poison Ivy, Poison Oak, Poison Sumac and Their Relatives; Pistachios, Mangoes and Cashews. The Boxwood Press. Pacific Grove, Calif. .

External links

Article about urushi lacquer made from the sap of the Urushi tree of Japan
Article about poison oak
UVSC Herbarium - Toxicodendron

Toxicodendron vernix (poison sumac) identification
 

 
Anacardiaceae genera
Taxa named by Philip Miller